The 2006–07 Frölunda HC season began with many rosters moves. 11 players were lost to other teams or retirement. 7 players were acquired to replace the players that were leaving, most notably Steve Kariya and Martin Cibák. Another two players, Joel Gistedt and Jonas Ahnelöv, were brought up from the juniors. The team's management was confident that they were going to finish in the top as they had done many previous seasons. It didn't take a long time to see that the team would not be the bona fide top team as they had been the previous seasons. Instead it was clear that they would be fighting for a playoff spot.

On November 7, after a rough start of the season, head coach Stephan Lundh was relieved of his duties. On November 8, Per Bäckman was signed from VIK Västerås HK as the new head coach of Frölunda HC. On November 9, assistant coach Calle Johansson decided to resign from his duties due to Lundh's release.

Regular season

Season standings

Game log

September

October

November

December

January

February

March

 Green background indicates win.
 Light green background indicates overtime win.
 Red background indicates regulation loss.
 Light red background indicates overtime loss.
 White background indicates tie game.

Season Stats

Scoring Leaders

Goaltending
Note: GP = Games played; W = Wins; L = Losses; OT = Overtime losses; GA = Goals against; SO = Shutouts; Sv% = Save percentage; GAA = Goals against average

Transactions

Trades

Drafted Players 

Frölunda HC players picked at the 2007 NHL Entry Draft in Columbus, Ohio.

References

General

Footnotes

2006-07
2006–07 in Swedish ice hockey